Dr. Harry Fumba Moniba (22 October 1937 – 24 November 2004) was a politician in Liberia hailing from the northwestern county of Lofa. He was the 26th vice president of Liberia from 1984 to September 1990 under the banner of the National Democratic Party of Liberia and ran for president in 1997. He planned to run in the 2005 Liberian presidential election but was killed in a 2-car accident in Michigan on 24 November 2004. He was afforded one of the largest state funerals in Liberian history. He left behind his wife Minita, and their five children. His burial site was contested with several groups of Liberians threatening violence were he not buried in his home county, while others advocated his burial on the grounds of the national gravesite. His family decided to place his remains in the compound of their suburban Monrovia home. Two funerals were held in honor of Dr. Moniba: one in the United States and one in his home country of Liberia. At the U.S. funeral, Dr. Moniba's widow (Minita) was presented with the United States flag by Congressman Nick Smith. The flag had been flown at half mast over the U.S Capitol, making him the only Liberian in history to receive such an honor. The Congressman stated, "Dr. Moniba loved his country, and worked tirelessly to establish peace and prosperity for Liberia. He understood well the true role of a politician in a democratic society." A room was dedicated in Dr. Moniba's honor at the Liberian Embassy in Washington D.C. in February 2007. He also has a primary school named in his honor in Monrovia, Liberia.

Vice-Presidency
Harry Moniba served as interim vice president from 1984 to 1985 before serving as Liberia's elected vice president from 6 January 1986 to September 1990.  While vice president, he was captured by dissident forces in 1985 and, at gun point, was told to turn in the resignation of the government on national radio.  Refusing to do so, he gave one of the speeches that he is most famous for, imploring all Liberians never to resort to violence to settle disputes.

In her memoir 'This Child Will Be Great', President of Liberia, Ellen Johnson Sirleaf, describes the general election of 1985 as rigged, claiming that the results were 'utterly, utterly false.'  Johnson Sirleaf ran for Senator in the election, winning her seat, but along with others protesting the widespread election fraud, refused to take it.

Diplomatic career
Moniba's career culminated to him serving as the Vice President of the Republic of Liberia from 1985 to 1990.  He also served in the posts of Ambassador Extraordinary and Plenipotentiary of the Republic of Liberia to the Court of St. James, London, England, and the Sovereign Military Order Malta, Rome, Italy.  Dr. Moniba also held the posts of Assistant Minister of Foreign Affairs, Director of Research at the Ministry of Education in Monrovia, Liberia and First Secretary & Consul to the Embassy of Liberia in Washington D.C. and Ottawa, Canada.

Awards
Moniba received an award from the Liberian Human Rights Chapter in 1994 in honor of his dedicated and tireless efforts in respecting human life.  The Chapter stated that along with not supporting any faction in the civil war, "Moniba always valued equality and justice for all and felt as if this was a sign that their fellow Liberian country men and women was acknowledging his hard work in his fight against human suffering."

Education
Dr. Moniba earned his PhD, in International Relations and African Studies at Michigan State University.  He received his Masters of Science Degree in Secondary Education with a Minor in Nineteenth Century European Studies at New York University and received his Post master's degree in International Relations and European Studies at State University of New York, New Paltz, New York.  His bachelor's degree in Secondary Education (Cum Laude) was earned at Cuttington University College, Liberia.

Publications
Published Manuscript:  Liberian Politics Today: Some Personal Observations.
In regards to it, Dr. Moniba stated: "In this work, I attempted to tell my fellow Liberians some problems in national leadership from my vantage point as Vice President of Liberia from 1984 to 1990, and how Liberians can avoid future conflicts and dangerous pitfalls of blind partisanship and ethnicity in good governance.  I also reviewed the different types of democratic forms of government as seen in the West and their general impact on national development, particularly in third world countries."

In his next book titled, A Vision of the Future, he advised Liberians about what needed to be done in postwar Liberia in order to ensure national unity, political stability in governance, and socio-economic development.  Dr. Moniba stated, "I further emphasized the need for every Liberian to have a new vision of a Liberia based on social justice, respect for human rights and rule of law.  I also admonished my countrymen to remember that what had happened to us during the civil war should be a lesson for everyone to learn from in our arduous task for national reconstruction,democracy and reconciliation."

Sources
 "Dr. Harry F. Moniba Foundation" A Legacy of Public Service Integrity
 "Liberia’s Former Vice President Harry Moniba Is Dead" 26 November 2004
 "Quiet Remembrance of Dr. Harry Fumba Moniba" 21 November 2005

References

1937 births
2004 deaths
Vice presidents of Liberia
Road incident deaths in Michigan
Cuttington University alumni
State University of New York at New Paltz alumni
Michigan State University alumni
New York University alumni
Candidates for President of Liberia
National Democratic Party of Liberia politicians
People from Lofa County
20th-century Liberian politicians